Zarrinshahr Airport is located in the Zarrin shahr area of Isfahan, one of the functions of Lenjan city.

References 

Airports in Iran